The 2018–19 Denver Pioneers men's basketball team represented the University of Denver during the 2018–19 NCAA Division I men's basketball season. The Pioneers, led by third-year head coach Rodney Billups, played their home games at Magness Arena and are members of The Summit League. They finished the season 8–22, 3–13 in Summit League play to finish in last place. They failed to qualify for the 2019 Summit League tournament.

Previous season
The Pioneers finished the season 15–15, 8–6 in Summit League play to finish in third place. In the Summit League tournament, they defeated Oral Roberts in the quarterfinals before losing to South Dakota State in the semifinals.

Roster

Schedule and results
 
|-
!colspan=9 style=| Non-conference regular season

|-
!colspan=9 style=| The Summit League regular season

|-

Source

Notable alumni
Ronnie Harrell (born 1996), basketball player for Hapoel Gilboa Galil of the Israeli Basketball Premier League

References

Denver Pioneers men's basketball seasons
Denver
Denver Pioneers
Denver Pioneers